My Alibi is a web series produced by Take180 (a subsidiary of The Walt Disney Company).  The series, consisting of up to 18 episodes, was one of the first series produced by the site, and one of the most well received. The show, like many on the site, took fan submissions and integrated them into each episode.

The show was picked up for distribution on Abcfamily.com in February 2009.

The series premiered on August 18, 2008, on Take180.com and YouTube, and concluded on February 20, 2009 with each episode averaging around 25,000 views on Take180.com.

Plot
The core plot of My Alibi revolves around a group of students who are sent to the principal (played by Gabrielle Carteris) after a large prank is pulled during the first period of school. All five students were late that day, and are locked in a room together until one of them steps forward and confesses. While they are together, each student relates the story of what they had done that morning along with other related events in their lives, often containing ludicrous twists.

Cast
 Alison Brie as Rebecca Fuller
 Zachary Burr Abel as Jonah Madigan
 Adam Chambers as Cy Woods
 Cyrina Fiallo as Marley Carabello
 Julianna Guill as Scarlet Hauksson
 Marque Richardson as Justin Walker
 Gabrielle Carteris as Principal Tuckerman

References

External links
 My Alibi: Season 1 - Playlist from The So What! - YouTube
 My_Alibi on Take180 - official site
 My Alibi on ABCFamily.com
 
 Take180 profile on YouTube

2008 web series debuts
2009 web series endings
American comedy web series
YouTube original programming